This alphabetic list of townships in Iowa and their counties is based on the U.S. Census for 2000. Iowa has 1,599 townships.

Townships in the U.S. state of Iowa are distinct geographical areas. For civil administrative purposes, Iowa state law allows each county board of supervisors to divide the county into townships. An elected or appointed board of trustees governs each township. The trustees are often elected, but may be appointed by the county board of supervisors if authorized by voters after a referendum. Township trustees also serve as fence viewers and may resolve conflicts upon request. Iowa townships may provide fire protection, emergency medical services, cemeteries, community centers, playgrounds, and, upon voter approval, public halls. Although Iowa townships may levy taxes, the county board of supervisors issues anticipatory bonds on behalf of the township and the compensation of township trustees (other than fees) is paid by the county government. For this reason, townships in Iowa are classified as administrative subdivisions of the counties and are not counted as separate governments in the United States Census of Governments.

See also
 List of townships in Iowa by county
 List of counties in Iowa
 List of cities in Iowa

References

 
Townships
Iowa